Institute of Astronomy of Kharkiv National University, or Kharkiv Astronomical Observatory — is a scientific institution at Kharkiv University. The institution was founded in 1808 as the astronomy laboratory of the university, and in 1888, mainly due to the efforts of Gregory Levitsky, a fully equipped observatory in a separate house was created.

At present, the main topics of scientific research at the observatory are the laws of light scattering by the surfaces of celestial bodies, small bodies of the Solar System, stellar catalogues and stellar dynamics, and gravitational lenses. The Chuhuiv Observational Station, where the institute's main astronomical instruments are located, is subordinate to the institute. The Institute also hosts Museum of Astronomy.

Directors 
 Grigori Levitski (1883—1894)
 Ludwig von Struve (1894—1917)
 Nikolai Yevdokimov (1917—1929)
 Nikolai P. Barabashov (1930—1971)
 Vladimir Yezerskiy (1971—1977)
 Vladimir Dudinov (1977—1993)
 Vladimir Zakhozhay (1993—2004)
 Yuriy G. Shkuratov (2004—2014)
 Vadym Kaydash (since 2014)

Noted scientists 
Academicians:
 Nikolai P. Barabashov (Academy of Sciences of Ukrainian SSR)
 Vasily Fesenkov (Academy of Sciences of the Kazakh SSR)

Corresponding members:
 Yuriy G. Shkuratov (NAS of Ukraine)

Winners of State Prize of Ukraine in Science and Technology:
 1986: Vladimir Dudinov, Dmitriy G. Stankevich, Victoria Tsvetkova, Yuriy G. Shkuratov
 2010: Irina Belskaya, Vadym Kaydash, Dmitrij F. Lupishko

Winners of M. P. Barabashov Prize of the National Academy of Sciences of Ukraine:
 1987: Leonid Akimov, Yuriy Aleksandrov, Dmitrij F. Lupishko
 1997: Yuriy G. Shkuratov
 2012: Fyodor Velichko, Yurij N. Krugly, Vasilij G. Shevchenko

Winners of S. Ya. Braude Prize of the National Academy of Sciences of Ukraine:
 2010: Viktor Vakulik

Winners of Ye. P. Fedorov Prize of the National Academy of Sciences of Ukraine:
 2012: Peter N. Fedorov

Literature 
 Шкуратов Ю. Г. 200 лет астрономии в Харьковском университете. — Харьков, 2008. — 632 с. — 500 прим.
 Балишев М.А. Астрономія в Харкові у роки громадянської війни періоду Української революції (1917-1921). Дослідження з історії і філософії науки і техніки. 2020. Т.29. №2. С.110-118.
 Балишев М.А. Харківська астрономічна обсерваторія під час німецької окупації (1941–1943) у роки Другої світової війни. Історія науки і біографістика. 2020. №3.

References

External links
 Institute of Astronomy of Kharkiv National University
 Розенфельд М. Харьковские истории. Выпуск 12: «Обратная сторона луны»

Astronomical observatories in Ukraine
National University of Kharkiv
Kharkiv Observatory